Roland Omnès (born 18 February 1931) is the author of several books which aim to give non-scientists the information required to understand quantum mechanics from an everyday standpoint.

Biography 

Omnès is currently Professor Emeritus of Theoretical Physics in the Faculté des sciences at Orsay, at the Université Paris-Sud XI. He has been instrumental in developing the consistent histories and quantum decoherence approaches in quantum mechanics. In 1959 he received the Paul-Langevin Prize.

Philosophical work 
In his philosophical work (especially in Quantum Philosophy), Omnès argues that:

 "Until modern times, intuitive, rational thought was sufficient to describe the world; mathematics remained an adjunct, simply helping to make our intuitive descriptions more precise."
 "In the late 19th and early 20th centuries, we arrived at a Fracture between common sense and our best descriptions of reality. Our formal description became the truest picture (most consistent with how things are, experimentally) and common sense was left behind. Our best descriptions of reality are now incomprehensible to common sense alone, and our intuitions as to how things are, are often negated by experiment and theory."
 "However it is, finally, possible to recover common sense from our formal, mathematical description of reality. We can now demonstrate that the laws of classical logic, classical probability and classical dynamics (of common sense, in fact) apply at the macroscopic level, even in a world described by a single, unitary wavefunction. This follows from the fundamental principles of quantum mechanics, with no need for extralogical constructs such as wavefunction collapse."

"We will never", Omnès believes, "find a common sense interpretation of quantum law itself. Nevertheless, it is now possible to see that common sense and quantum reality are compatible with each other: we can enter the world at either starting point, and we will find that each leads to the other: experiment leads to theory, and the theory can now recover the common sense framework in which the experiment was conducted (and in which our lives are lived)."

The new 'Copenhagen Interpretation'? 

Omnès' work is sometimes described as an updating of the Copenhagen interpretation of quantum mechanics. This is somewhat misleading. The relationship between the two accounts is as follows.

The Copenhagen interpretation of quantum mechanics (argued for most centrally by Niels Bohr) tells us to "shut up and calculate". It says that there are certain questions we simply cannot ask, and that there are inexplicable rules which we have to apply in order to get from a quantum description of reality (which we know is experimentally correct to at least 10 decimal places of accuracy) to the reality of our day-to-day, common sense lives (which seems self-evidently correct, and yet is apparently in contradiction with quantum law).

Omnès tells us that we no longer have to shut up in order to calculate: there is now a self-consistent framework which enables us to recover the principles of classical common sense - and to know, precisely, their limits - starting from fundamental quantum law.

Bibliography 

The work Omnès presents in his books was developed by Omnès himself, Robert B. Griffiths, Murray Gell-Mann, James Hartle, and others.

 The Interpretation of Quantum Mechanics (Princeton University Press, 1994) - a technical exposition of Omnès's account, for physicists.
 Understanding Quantum Mechanics (Princeton University Press, 1999) - a somewhat less technical revision and updating of the above work, also intended for physicists.
 Quantum Philosophy: Understanding and Interpreting Contemporary Science (English Edition - Princeton University Press, 1999); (French Edition - Gallimard, 1994)
 Converging Realities: Toward a Common Philosophy of Physics and Mathematics (Princeton University Press, 2004) - Here Omnès presents, in detail, his position on the relationship between mathematics and reality which he started to develop in Quantum Philosophy.

French physicists
École Normale Supérieure alumni
Academic staff of Paris-Sud University
Living people
1931 births